Sophia Bulkeley (née Stewart; fl. 1660–1718) was a Scottish Jacobite courtier.

Life
She was a younger daughter of Walter Stewart (or Stuart), the third son of Walter Stewart, 1st Lord Blantyre, M.P. for Monmouth, her elder sister being the court beauty Frances Stewart, Duchess of Richmond. The Stuarts were royalists, and were in exile in France under the Commonwealth.

Sophia returned to England after the Restoration of 1660, and in 1671 became a maid of honour to Queen Catherine of Braganza. About three years later she married Henry Bulkeley: he was fourth son of Thomas Bulkeley, 1st Viscount Bulkeley of Baron Hill, near Beaumaris, and brother of the royalist general Richard Bulkeley. Henry was master of the household successively to Charles II and James II. This marriage therefore placed Sophia in the inner court circles, and due course in 1685 she became lady of the bedchamber to Queen Mary of Modena.

About 1680 it was rumoured that Sidney Godolphin was enamoured of her. In October 1688 she was a witness with Queen Mary at the birth of her son, the young James, Prince of Wales. The Glorious Revolution saw her move with the Queen and Stuart court to France in December 1688.

Sophia Bulkeley remained a Jacobite loyalist, though she had personal reasons to return on occasion to England, something she managed in 1702. She tried to return again to England in 1713, on financial affairs, but was refused papers. She made a final attempt in 1718, which once more failed.

Family
Henry and Sophia Bulkeley had six children. James became a resident in France, and left a family there;

 François de Bulkeley, Lieutenant-general; husband of Marie-Anne O'Mahony, daughter of Daniel O'Mahony and Cecilia Weld.
 Charlotte; first wife of Charles O'Brien, 5th Viscount Clare, and later of Daniel O'Mahony.
 Anne (d. 12 June 1751); married James FitzJames, 1st Duke of Berwick, illegitimate son of James II.

References

Attribution

17th-century Scottish people
18th-century Scottish people
17th-century Scottish women
18th-century Scottish women
Scottish Jacobites
Scottish ladies-in-waiting